Robinson Peak is a mountain with an elevation of  located in the Sierra Nevada mountain range, in Mono County of northern California, United States. The summit is situated on the boundary of Hoover Wilderness, on land managed by Humboldt–Toiyabe National Forest. The peak is set above the west end of Twin Lakes, two miles east of Victoria Peak, and 1.5 mile southeast of line parent Eagle Peak. Precipitation runoff from this mountain drains into tributaries of Robinson and Buckeye Creeks, which are within the Walker River drainage basin.

History
The peak is named in association with Robinson Creek, which in turn is named for Moses Robinson, an early pioneer who operated a sawmill there in the 1860s. The toponym has been officially adopted by the United States Board on Geographic Names.

The first ascent of the summit was likely made by the 1905–09 USGS survey team of George Davis, A. H. Sylvester, and Pearson Chapman, but the first documented ascent was made August 22, 1946, by K. Hargreaves, H. F. Watty, R. F. Dickey, Jr., and Ken Crowley.

Climate
According to the Köppen climate classification system, Robinson Peak is located in an alpine climate zone. Most weather fronts originate in the Pacific Ocean, and travel east toward the Sierra Nevada mountains. As fronts approach, they are forced upward by the peaks (orographic lift), causing moisture in the form of rain or snowfall to drop onto the range.

See also
 
 List of mountain peaks of California

Gallery

References

External links
 Weather forecast: Robinson Peak

Mountains of Mono County, California
North American 3000 m summits
Mountains of Northern California
Sierra Nevada (United States)
Humboldt–Toiyabe National Forest